Glehn may refer to:

Geography 
 Glehn (Mechernich), a district of Mechernich, Euskirchen, North Rhine-Westphalia, Germany
 Glehn (Korschenbroich), North Rhine-Westphalia, Germany
 Glehn Castle, castle of Nikolai von Glehn in Vana-Mustamäe, Nõmme, Tallinn, Estonia

Other 
 De Glehn, a compound steam locomotive system named after Alfred de Glehn
 Glehn's spruce, (Picea glehnii), a species of conifer named after Peter von Glehn
 Glehnia,  a monotypic genus in the carrot family Apiaceae named after Peter von Glehn

People with the surname
 Alfred de Glehn (1848–1936), French railroad engineer; brother of Louise Creighton, uncle of Oswald von Glehn and Wilfred de Glehn 
 Jane Emmet de Glehn (1873–1961), American figure and portrait painter; wife of Wilfrid de Glehn
 Louise von Glehn (1850–1936), maiden name of British historian Louise Creighton
 Nikolai von Glehn (1841–1923), Baltic German estate owner, founder of the town of Nõmme
 Peter von Glehn (1835–1876), Russian botanist
 Wilfrid de Glehn (1870–1951), British impressionist painter

See also 
 Geleen
 Cleen

German-language surnames